Deus Arrakis is the forty-seventh album by Klaus Schulze. It was released on 1 July 2022. It is the final album Schulze made before he died.

Track listing
All tracks composed by Klaus Schulze.

Personnel
 Klaus Schulze – electronics
 Tom Dams – electronics
 Wolfgang Tiepold – cello on "Seth"
 Eva-Maria Kagermann – voice noises on "Der Hauch des Lebens"

Charts

References

External links
 Deus Arrakis at the official site of Klaus Schulze
 Deus Arrakis at Discogs
 AllMusic

Klaus Schulze albums
Ambient albums
Trance albums
2022 albums